Sir Abdur Rahim,  (7 September 1867 – 1952), sometimes spelled Abdul Rahim, was a judge and politician in British India, and a leading member of the Muslim League. He was President of the Nikhil Banga Praja Samiti from 1929 to 1934 and of the Central Legislative Assembly of India from 1935 to 1945.

Life

Rahim was born into a highly educated family of Bengal, the son of Mawlawi Abdur Rab, who was a zamindar in the province's Midnapore district. Educated at Presidency College, Calcutta, and in England at the Inns of Court, he became a barrister of the Calcutta High Court in 1890, and later became a founding and influential member of the Muslim League.

Beyond his profession, Rahim was active in the world of education and became a member of the Senate and the Syndicate of the University of Madras. He was one of those who successfully promoted the foundation of the Maulana Azad College.

On 20 July 1908, Rahim was appointed a Judge of the High Court of Judicature at Madras, and in September 1912 (with Lord Islington, Lord Ronaldshay, Herbert Fisher, and others) as a member of the Royal Commission on the Public Services in India of 1912–1915.

Rahim went on to become Chief Justice of the High Court of Madras and Tagore Professor of Law in the University of Calcutta. In the 1919 Birthday Honours, he was knighted.

While he was still a judge of the High Court of Madras, Rahim gave a series of lectures at the University of Calcutta which were later published under the title The Principles of Muhammadan Jurisprudence according to the Hanafi, Maliki, Shafi'i, and Hanbali Schools. This work considers some recent European books on philosophy and law and compares the Islamic and European principles of jurisprudence, combining classical and modern learning.

Entering politics, he became a member of the Bengal Province Executive Council and served as the province's Administrator of Justice and Allied Subjects from 1921 to 1925.

In the 1925 Birthday Honours, Rahim was appointed a Knight Commander of the Order of the Star of India (KCSI).

In December 1925 and January 1926, Rahim chaired the 17th session of the All-India Muslim League at Aligarh, when he said – 

In 1926, he presided over the All-India Mohammadan Educational Conference and argued for the use of the Urdu language among all Indian Muslims. The Hindu leaders became hostile to Rahim, and when in 1927 the Governor of Bengal offered him a place in the Provincial government, the Hindus refused to work with him.

Also in 1926, he formed a political party called the Bengal Muslim Party. The Modern Review commented: For any Muslim, and particularly for Sir Abdur Rahim, to form such a party cannot surprise anybody. But what is amusing is that he has felt it necessary to camouflage it as something other than what it is. For the party speaks in the opening paragraph of its manifesto in the most liberal and nonsectarian tones.

In 1928, Rahim was the president of the Bengal Muslim Conference which opposed the Nehru Report, and in 1930 of the Bengal Muslim Conference which opposed the proposals of the Simon Commission.

From 1929 to 1934, he was President of the Nikhil Banga Praja Samiti, or All Bengal Tenant Association.

In 1931, he was elected to the Central Legislative Assembly of India, and while Mohammad Ali Jinnah was overseas for the Round Table Conferences, Rahim led the Independent Party. On 24 January 1935, he was elected as the assembly's president, which effectively ended his public involvement in partisan politics, but he retained strong views on the interests of Muslim Indians. He served as president of the Central Legislative Assembly from 1935 until 1945.

A member of the Indian Military College Committee, Rahim was sometimes skeptical of British policy. He was also opposed to recruiting men from outside India into the Indian Army, such as the Gurkhas, which he described as "absolutely an anti-Indian policy".

In June 1939, the Viceroy, Lord Linlithgow, wrote to the Secretary of State for India, Lord Zetland, after sounding out Rahim on Muslim attitudes towards the proposed Federation of India – 

In October 1939, with Sir Abdullah Haroon, Rahim visited Allama Mashriqi, leader of the Khaksars, shortly after his release from jail.

In 1946, Rahim donated his collection of 333 Arabic books, mostly on religion, to the Imperial Library (now the National Library of India), where they are known as the Sir Abdur Rahim Collection.

After moving to Pakistan in 1947, he settled in Karachi, where he eventually suffered from pneumonia and died in 1952.

His daughter Begum Niaz Fatima married the barrister Huseyn Shaheed Suhrawardy (1892–1963), who later became the fifth Prime Minister of Pakistan, while his son Jalaludin Abdur Rahim was a Nietzschean philosopher and one of the founders of the Pakistan People's Party.

Publications

References

External links
Photograph of Sir Abdur Rahim

1867 births
1952 deaths
Pakistani writers
Writers from Karachi
Pakistani scholars
Pakistani jurists
Leaders of the Pakistan Movement
British India judges
Presidents of the Central Legislative Assembly of India
Knights Commander of the Order of the Star of India
Indian Knights Bachelor
Members of the Central Legislative Assembly of India
University of Calcutta alumni
Academic staff of the University of Calcutta
Judges of the Madras High Court
Chief Justices of the Madras High Court
Pakistani people of Bengali descent
20th-century Bengalis
Bengali lawyers
Bengali Muslims
People from Midnapore
19th-century Bengalis